Maria Astashkina, (born 5 April 1999 in Penza, Russia) is a Russian swimmer.
She won 4 gold medals in (200 m, 100 m, 50m breaststroke and 4 × 100 m medley) at the 2015 European Games.

Career 

In 2014, Astashkina competed at the 2014 European Junior Championships winning 4 gold medals in (200 m, 100 m, 50m breaststroke and 4 × 100 m medley), that same year, she competed in seniors at the 2014 European Championships and at the 2014 FINA World Swimming Championships (25 m) in Doha, Qatar where she qualified for the finals in 200 m breaststroke finishing in 6th place and with Team Russia finishing 5th in 4 × 100 m women's medley.

In June 2015, 16 year old Astashkina was selected to compete at the inaugural 2015 European Games in Baku, where she won four gold medals, in (200m, 100 m, 50m breaststroke), in 4 × 100 m medley (with Arina Openysheva, Polina Egorova and Maria Kameneva broke a new junior world record touching in at 4:03.22). Astashkina also broke a junior meet record in 200m breaststroke at the Games. On August 2–9, Astashkina competed in seniors at the 2015 World Championships in Kazan, however she did not reach the semifinals after losing in her preliminary heats.

On August 25–30, Astashkina then competed at the 2015 World Junior Swimming Championships in Singapore, she won a silver medal in individual women's 200 m breaststroke behind Turkey's Viktoriya Zeynep Gunes, she finished 4th in 100 m breaststroke, 6th in 50 m breaststroke and won gold with the Russian Team in women's 4 × 100 m medley.

In April 2016, Astashkina competed at the National Championships. She won a bronze medal in 200 m breastroke but she did not comply required time to qualify at the Olympics.

References

External links
 

1999 births
Living people
Sportspeople from Penza
Russian female swimmers
Russian female breaststroke swimmers
European Games gold medalists for Russia
European Games medalists in swimming
Swimmers at the 2015 European Games
European Aquatics Championships medalists in swimming
Louisville Cardinals women's swimmers